Sundergarh is a town in Sundergarh district of the Indian state of Odisha. As of 2011 census, the municipality had a population of 45,036. Sundargarh is recognized as an industrial district in Odisha. Steel, fertilizer, cement, ferrovanadium, machine-building, glass, china-clay plants and factories, and spinning mills are some of the major industries of this district. Sundargarh occupies a prominent position in the mineral map of Odisha and is rich in iron ore, limestone, and manganese.

Geography
It has an average elevation of 243 metres (801 feet). The Ib river flows along in the north.

Climate
The climate of this district is characterized by extremely hot summers and cool winters. The climate is hot and moist sub-humid. The normal rainfall of the district is approximately 1230  mm, but there is a deviation in receipt of rainfall pattern which is influencing crop production.

History
Sundargarh was the capital of the princely State of Gangpur till 1948 and became the district headquarters of Sundargarh district from 1948. It is understood that, in ancient times, Sundargarh was under the rulers of different dynasties. However, divergent views are available regarding the origin of the ruling family. The present royal family of Gangpur belongs to the Sekhar dynasty. This ex-state was under the suzerainty of Sambalpur, known as Hirakhand Desh, and later formed part of the dominion of the Maratha Rajas of Nagpur. This was ceded to the British Government in 1803 by the Maratha Chief Raghuji Bhonsla of Nagpur under the treaty of Deogaon (near Rourkela). This was restored to him by a special engagement in 1806. This was finally ceded in 1826. In 1905, this princely state along with Bonai was transferred from the control of the commissioner of Chhotanagpur to that of the Odisha Division and a separate political agent was appointed.

Demographics
 India census, the population of the town was 45,036. The male population was 22,754 and the female population was 22,282.

Transport
Sundargarh is connected to all major towns in Odisha by road. It is connected to Rourkela and Sambalpur by State Highway 10.

The nearest railway station is Jharsuguda railway station.

The nearest airport is Jharsuguda Airport which is 27 kilometers from the town.

Politics
The current MLA from Sundargarh Assembly Constituency is Kusum Tete of BJP, who won the seat in by-elections in 2006 after Sushama Patel who won the seat by election due to the death of her husband and seating MLA Sankarsan Naik who won the seat in the 2004 general election. Previous MLAs from this seat were Kishore Chandra Patel who won this seat representing INC in 1995 and in 1977, and also representing INC(I) in 1980, and Bharatendra Shekhar Deo who won this seat representing JD in 1990 and representing JNP in 1985.

Sundargarh is part of Sundargarh (Lok Sabha constituency). The current Member of Parliament is Jual Oram from BJP.

Education
There are many schools and two colleges exist in the town. The schools are both private and public, where as both the colleges are government run. The Govt. College is the oldest college in the town (inaugurated in 1958) which provides co-education and the Govt. Women's college accepts only female students.

A medical college is being constructed with the sponsorship of NTPC.
There is a new college being constructed with

Sports

A new synthetic (polygrass) hockey turf has been laid at the SAI Sports Complex in Bhawanipur, Sundargarh. This is the third synthetic hockey turf in the district of Sundargarh. The other turfs are at Panposh (Panposh Hockey Hostel) and Rourkela (Biju Patnaik Hockey Stadium). The Sports Authority of India (SAI) had approved the Rs. 2.25 crores project in 2007. The base work for the turf began in 2007, and was completed by May 2008. Then began the wait for synthetic turf, which arrived only in November 2008, and was subsequently laid by February 2009.

See also
 Kendriya Vidyalaya, Sundargarh

Notable people
 Dilip Tirkey - hockey player from Sundergarh

References

7. https://www.dailypioneer.com/2017/state-editions/60-natl-hockey-players-are-from-sundargarh.html

Cities and towns in Sundergarh district